Saint Bega was reputedly a saint of the Early Middle Ages; an Irish princess who became an anchoress and valued her virginity. Promised in marriage to a Viking prince who, according to a medieval manuscript The Life of St Bega, was "son of the king of Norway", Bega "fled across the Irish sea to land at St. Bees on the Cumbrian coast. There she settled for a time, leading a life of exemplary piety, then, fearing the raids of pirates which were starting along the coast, she moved over to Northumbria". The most likely time for this would have been after AD 850, when the Vikings were settling in Ireland.

The life of St. Bega
The account of Bega's flight from Ireland is found in the Life of St Bega, part of a collection of various English saints' lives that belonged to Holmcultram Abbey in Abbeytown, Cumbria, and is dated to the mid-13th century. The Life continues:

So the account has Bega living in seclusion, and after a time travelling to Northumbria, where she was admitted to sacred vows. It also states that she founded Hartlepool Abbey, a convent at Hartlepool, but modern historians believe the writer of the Life created a composite St Bega, with events from the lives of Heui, who founded that convent, and Begu; who was mentioned in Bede's life of St Hilda of Whitby. This confusion put Bega into the 7th century, which is clearly inconsistent, as the Vikings, whose raids supposedly led to her fleeing to St Bees, only appeared in the area and started raiding Ireland from ca.795 onwards.

The miracles

Bega is associated in legend with a number of miracles, the most famous being the "Snow miracle", which is described in the Life of St Bega thus:
"Ranulf le Meschin (sic) had endowed the monastery with its lands, but a lawsuit later developed about their extent. The monks feared a miscarriage of justice. The day appointed for a perambulation of the boundaries arrived – and, lo and behold, there was a thick snowfall on all the surrounding lands but not a flake upon the lands of the priory."

This version describes it as happening long after her death and concerns the monks of the Norman Priory.

However, a version of the Snow Miracle is also found in the Sandford manuscript. This was written in English after the dissolution of the Benedictine Priory (after 1539), and was formerly in the Dean and Chapter archives at Carlisle Cathedral. This garbled account is a less probable version than that in the Life, and sets the miracle in the days of St Bega herself.

The Life manuscript contains accounts of nine miracles brought about by the influence of St Bega. They are earthy folk tales with miraculous interpretation.
The first concerns a raider from Galloway in Scotland, who set out to steal a horse. His mother warned him against theft on the land of St Bega, but her son was scornful and moving his hands to the private parts of his buttocks he tauntingly said, "What can that little old woman do to me?" As he escaped on the horse, arrows were shot after him as he crouched low, and the inevitable happened. The third concerns Godard of Millom, whose men would not remove their horses from the monks' pasture to which they had strayed. When the men came to saddle the horses, they found the hooves almost severed, and in penance Godard gave the field to the Monks. The seventh miracle tells of three men of Workington, who were imprisoned in Egremont Castle for killing a man in a drunken brawl, but having confessed their sins to St Bega, were rescued by her and found sanctuary at St Bees. The ninth miracle tells of two sick brothers who, after seeing a vision at Tynemouth, travelled to St Bees in a cart, and were healed; leaving the cart as thanks.

The register of St Bees Priory records several miracles by the power of prayer to St Bega. In 1310 "God worked many miracles by the prayers and merits of St Bega...to the edification of all the people with many eye-witnesses". In 1313, "A certain Irish boy received his sight in the chapel of St Bega through the merits and prayers of the said virgin, all the community seeing it".

The cult

The name of the village Kirkeby Becok used in the charters of St Bees Priory from the times of Henry II and Richard I, and the phraseology of the early charters indicates a pre-Norman church at St Bees dedicated to St Bega.
At the granting of the first charter of the Benedictine priory one of the witnesses was Gillebecoc; meaning devotee of Beghoc, indicating a Bega cult already in existence. The writer of the Life relates that St Bega was given a bracelet in Ireland by a heavenly being, which she left behind in St Bees when she travelled to Northumberland. It was described as having a holy cross upon it, which fits a style of the 9th and 10th centuries. The bracelet is mentioned several times in the charters of St Bees Priory; one instance is in the middle of the 13th century, when an oath was taken by John of Hale "having touched the sacred things ... and upon the bracelet of St Bega". An account roll from as late as 1516/1517 records offerings of 67s. 9d to the bracelet of St Bega; so the cult and the relic were still a going concern at that late time.

Celebration

St Bega's Day

About 1400 it is recorded that St Bega's day was celebrated 'in albs' (for a lesser saint) at the mother house of St Mary's Abbey, York. A fifteenth-century Book of Hours in the Bodleian Library from St Mary's records the day as 7 November. Since this discovery in the late 20th century, St Bega's day has been celebrated in St Bees on this date.

Hymn to St Bega

The Hymn to St Bega, "Oracio ad Sanctam Begam", was discovered in the late 20th century in the 15th-century book of hours mentioned above. It would undoubtedly have been sung on St Bega's day, and the full text is printed in John Todd's article reproduced on the St Bees website . The Hymn received its first modern performance on St Bega's Day 1981 at St Bees Priory, using an original composition for orchestra, change ringing tower bells and choir by Hugh Turpin.

Cult or person?
Present day scholarship tends to treat St Bega not as a historical personage but a cult.  As one scholar states; "The discovery of inconsistencies between these medieval texts, coupled with the significance attached to her jewellery (said to have been left in Cumbria on her departure for the north-east), now indicate that the abbess never existed. ... More plausible is the suggestion that St Bega was the personification of a Cumbrian cult centred on 'her' bracelet (Old English: beag)".
The 1999 edition of the Dictionary of National Biography includes an article (by Professor Robert Bartlett) that treats St Bega as a mythical figure. A 1980 paper by John Todd offers a comprehensive review of the historical references to that date, including a discussion on her existence. He finishes with the words "We must search for the historical St Bega, not in the glorious years of the Northumbrian Kingdom, but the dark years of its fall. But our search may well be disappointed".

The modern legend
The 16th-century historian John Leland seems to have been responsible for starting the "convent" legend by reference to a "humble little monastery". Unfortunately some 19th-century local historians unquestioningly accepted the pre-Viking era date given in the Life, and presumably prompted by Leland, they embellished the tale with the founding of a convent. In the words of John Todd writing in 1980, "Local historians in the last century had no doubt about the answer. She was an Irish saint who crossed the sea about 650 to found a convent at St Bees, which was destroyed in the Viking invasion. But there is no evidence in the Life or elsewhere that Bega's life at St Bees was other than solitary". Regrettably, the very dubious 7th-century date and the imaginary convent are perpetuated today in many guidebooks, including the pages of Nikolaus Pevsner.

St. Bega in modern writing
Melvyn Bragg wrote the long historical novel Credo, with St Bega as the central character. He telescoped the events and dates of several centuries into the lifespan of the saint. However, this is freely admitted as an artistic device; unlike the medieval writer of the Life. The work re-awakened interest in St Bega.

In 2000, local author Jill Hudson was commissioned by St Bees Priory PCC to write a play about St Bega to celebrate the Millennium. This play, 'The Bracelet of St Bega', was staged in the Priory for three nights in November 2000. A fresh adaptation by Gus Kennedy was similarly staged in the Priory in November 2010 in the week of the feast of St Bega.

Lorna Goodison wrote a poem Across the fields to St Begas, reprinted in The Guardian.

Folklore author and esoteric explorer Alex Langstone has written about Bega in his controversial psychic questing book Spirit Chaser, which includes parts of her legendary life and connections to Bassenthwaite and St Bees in Cumbria.

Churches of St Bega
The parish church of Bassenthwaite, Cumbria, some distance south of the village near Bassenthwaite Lake, is dedicated to St Bega. It was built around 950AD and is still used for regular services and weddings; it is a graded II* listed building.

The Roman Catholic 1860s church of St Begh in Whitehaven, near St Bees, is dedicated to St Bega.

The Orthodox Parish, worshipping in Keswick and at Braithwaite Chapel, is dedicated to St Bega, St Mungo, and St Herbert.

See also
St Bega's Way

References

External links
St Bega, cult, fact and legend by John M Todd on St Bees village website (Full text of CWAAS article)
 The pre-conquest church in St Bees, Cumbria: a possible minster church? Paper by John Todd exploring this possibility and describing religious life in West Cumbria in the era of the legend of St Bega.
Begnet, patron saint of Dalkey, whose stories may have become conflated with those of Bega
 C. Downham, 'St Bega- Myth, Maiden or Bracelet', Journal of Medieval History 33 (2007) 33–42
 St Bega's Way a short long-distance walk from St Bees to St Bega's Church, Bassenthwaite, Cumbria, UK.

9th-century Christian saints
Northumbrian saints
Medieval Irish saints
Anglo-Saxon women
Anglo-Saxon saints
Irish princesses
Irish expatriates in England
Female saints of medieval England
9th-century Irish people
9th-century Irish women
9th-century English people
9th-century English women
Female saints of medieval Ireland
People from St Bees